Katulpur Assembly constituency is an assembly constituency in Bankura district in the Indian state of West Bengal. It is reserved for scheduled castes.

Overview
As per orders of the Delimitation Commission, No. 256 Katulpur Assembly constituency (SC) is composed of the following: Deshra-koyalpara, Gopinathpur, Kotulpur, Lego, Mirzapur and Sihar gram panchayats of Kotulpur community development block; Gelia, Jagannathpur, Kuchiakol, Maynapur,
Salda, Uttarbarh, Hetia, Routkhanda and Shyamnagar gram panchayats of Joypur community development block.

Katulpur Assembly constituency is part of No. 37 Bishnupur (Lok Sabha constituency).

Members of Legislative Assembly

Election results

2014 bye election
The bypoll to the Kotulpur seat was necessitated after sitting MLA of Congress Soumitra Khan Switched To Trinamool Congress & Elected as MP of Bishnupur Lok Sabha constituency.

 

Percentage swing with respect to General Election 2011.

2011

.# Swing calculated on Congress+Trinamool Congress vote percentages taken together in 2006.

1977-2006
In the 2006 state assembly elections, Kalpana Koley of CPI(M) won the Katulpur assembly seat defeating her nearest rival Aloka Sen Majumdar of Trinamool Congress. Contests in most years were multi cornered but only winners and runners are being mentioned. Manashi Ghose of CPI(M) defeated Sunil Das of Trinamool Congress in 2001. Gouripada Dutta of CPI(M) defeated Nikhil Bose of Congress in 1996, Akshay Kumar Koley of Congress in 1991, and Bablu Kolay of Congress in 1987. Gunadhar Choudhury of CPI(M) defeated Aksay Kumar Koley of Congress in 1982 and 1977.

1957-1972
Akshay Kumar Kolay of Congress won in 1972. Jatadhari Mukhopadhyay of CPI(M) won in 1971, Niranjan Bhadra of Bangla Congress won in 1969. S.Sarkar of Bangla Congress won in 1967. Jagannath Kolay of Congress won in 1962 and 1957. Prior to that the Katulpur seat was not there.

References

Assembly constituencies of West Bengal
Politics of Bankura district